Rindos v. Hardwick was a case of Internet defamation heard in 1994 in which Western Australian lawyers representing a visiting American academic sought to create a legal precedent by deeming an email sent by Gil Hardwick to have alleged paedophilia against David Rindos, a probationary lecturer in Archaeology at the University of Western Australia.

Facts
Hardwick was living at the time with his wife and young family in Derby as part of a field trip into the Great Sandy Desert in the far north-west of Western Australia. As far as can be ascertained, Hardwick was studying in a different department, had not experienced any professional differences with Dr Rindos, and in fact hardly knew him beyond Rindos' insistence on being granted tenure, the Rindos affair.

Hardwick's email seeking to clarify the situation in the midst of global hysteria among homosexual academics and their supporters being incited by the case was posted to the Usenet newsgroup sci.anthropology in response to prolonged haranguing of the group by Rindos and his supporters.

The background controversy was apparently concerned with preferential homosexual and lesbian engagement between staff and selected students; and more generally over the disruption to their studies caused by radical changes wrought by the then Hawke Federal Labor Government. Whether this had any bearing on the University's repeated refusal to grant Rindos tenure is not known, beyond the fact that the tenure system was being phased out in any event to be replaced by the system of contract now in use.

Law
The case in law focused on a Usenet posting made via DIALix, arguably Australia's first commercial Internet service provider, although the court did not consider whether the ISP was responsible for carriage of the message.

Further reading

External links
 Hardwick's post
 [web.archive.org/http://decisions.justice.wa.gov.au/supreme/supdcsn.nsf/c04d382e733a94a148256fc4002b2e2b/12ce060858b5eb9e4825641300205ca6?OpenDocument&Highlight=2,rindos RINDOS -v- HARDWICK] - judgement by the Supreme Court of Western Australia

Australian defamation case law
Computer case law
1994 in Australian law
1994 in case law
Western Australia case law